Meera Chandrasekhar (ಡಾ. ಮೀರಾ ಚಂದ್ರಶೇಖರ್), is a Curators’ Teaching of Physics and Astronomy at the University of Missouri, United States. She is the recipient of the 2014 Baylor University's Robert Foster Cherry Award for Great Teaching.  Her research focuses on optical spectroscopy of semiconductors and superconductors under pressure.  Meera has also developed several hands-on physics programs for students in grades 5-12, and summer institutes for K-12 teachers.

Early life and education
Chandrasekhar was born in Andhra Pradesh, India. Her father Chandrapal (ಚಂದ್ರಪಾಲ್) was an officer in the Indian Army, and her mother Kusuma (ಕುಸುಮಾ) was a home-maker. During her childhood she lived in several towns and cities across India. She is married to H.R.Chandrasekhar, Professor of Physics and Astronomy at the University of Missouri. They have three children.

Education
Meera Chandrapal, obtained a B.Sc. degree from M.G.M.College, Udupi in 1968, an M.Sc. from the Indian Institute of Technology, Madras, India, and a Ph.D. from Brown University, Providence Rhode Island (1976). After a post-doctoral fellowship at Max Planck Institute for Solid State Research, Stuttgart, Germany, she came to the University of Missouri, Columbia in 1978, where she is currently a Professor in the Department of Physics and Astronomy.

Research interests
Chandrasekhar's research interests are in the area of optical spectroscopy of semiconductors, superconductors, and conjugated polymers, with an emphasis on high-pressure studies. She has published over 120 papers in this area.

Educational interests
Chandrasekhar has an interest in education at all levels. At the university level she has restructured several courses in her department, and developed a physics course for elementary education majors that has an annual enrollment of over 140 students. Beginning in 1993, she led a series of programs for K-12 students and their teachers, supported by the National Science Foundation, and the Missouri Department of Higher Education. The programs included Exploring Physics for 5-7 grade female students, which focused on learning physics concepts through hands-on activities; Family Evenings with Science and Technology (FEST), a middle school parent and student program where each team built a miniature working drawbridge; Saturday Scientist, an industry based experience for 8-9 grade students designed to increase students' awareness of potential careers in the physical sciences; Newton Summer Science Academy for 9-11 grade girls, which integrated science, engineering and mathematics through a toy factory building project; and summer teacher academies for 5-12 grade science teachers. For her mentoring of young students, she received the Presidential Award for Science, Mathematics and Engineering Mentoring (PAESMEM) award in 1999. The most recent project, A TIME for Physics First, focuses on professional development and leadership training for science teachers so they can implement a yearlong course in physics at the 9th grade level. As part of this project, she and a colleague, Dorina Kosztin led the development of Exploring Physics, a digital curriculum for conceptual physics.

Honors
 2014 Robert Foster Cherry Award for Great Teaching, Baylor University
 2013 Finalist, Robert Foster Cherry Award for Great Teaching, Baylor University
 2008 Missouri Educator Award, Science Teachers of Missouri
 2006 Presidential Award for Outstanding Teaching, University of Missouri
 2004 Curator's Distinguished Teaching Professorship, University of Missouri 
 2004 Science Teachers of Missouri Distinguished Service Award 
 2002 Distinguished Alumnus Award, Indian Institute of Technology, Madras 
 1999 Presidential Award for Excellence in Science, Mathematics and Engineering Mentoring
 1998 Governor's Award for Excellence in Teaching 
 1997 William T. Kemper Fellowship for Teaching Excellence, University of Missouri 
 1992 Elected Fellow of the American Physical Society 
 1990 Chancellor's Award for Outstanding Research and Creative Activity in the Physical and Mathematical Sciences, University of Missouri
 1987 Purple Chalk award for Excellence in Teaching. College of Arts and Science Student Government 
 1985 Alfred P. Sloan Fellowship 
 1970 Bronze Medal and Certificate of Merit for the first rank in the M.Sc. class, Indian Institute of Technology, Madras 
 1968 Gold Medal for distinction and first rank in the B.Sc. class, Mysore University 
 1965-70 National Science Talent Search Scholarship sponsored by the Government of India

Interactions with popular media
 Getting Girls to E=mc^2, Columbia Missourian, 1993.
 Kemper Award, Columbia Missourian, 1997
 Scientist who Mentors Girls gets Presidential Award, St. Louis Post Dispatch, 1999.
 An Interview with Meera Chandrasekhar Making Strides Newsletter, News On Minority Graduate Education (MGE) Volume 2 Number 1 February 2000.  By Virginia Van Horne, MGE Senior Research Associate.

References

External links
 Blind to Polarization - What Humans do not see (video) Lecture at Baylor University, October 2013.
Indian-American Wins Top US Teaching Award, The Economic Times, 18 January 2014.
 Semiconductors and Superconductors Under High Pressure, Bangalore Science Forum Lecture (video), 5 July 2015.
 Transforming Perceptions of Physics IIT Madras - I & AR, Leadership Lecture series (video) 9 July 2015.
 Missourian. MU professors develop app to help teach ninth-graders physics, YUAN YUAN 14 Sep 2015 
 Physics now mandatory in some Freshman classrooms, KMZU 100.7 FM, Ashley Johnson, 15 September 2015
 A conversation with Meera Chandrasekhar: This MU physics professor is bringing technology, gender balance and understanding to science education VOX magazine – By Arthur Cook Bremer, 3 December 2015

21st-century American physicists
Indian American
1949 births
Living people
People from Udupi
University of Missouri physicists
Physicists from Missouri
Women physicists
Fellows of the American Physical Society